Montero is a Spanish surname meaning the occupational name for a beater or other assistant at a hunt, from an agent derivative of monte, which, as well as meaning 'mountain', 'hill'. Notable people with the surname include:

 Adalí Montero (born 1982), Peruvian singer-songwriter
 Amaia Montero (born 1976), Spanish singer-songwriter
 Carlos Caridad Montero (born 1967), Venezuelan film director
 Edgardo Abdala Montero (born 1978), Palestinian-Chilean footballer
 Elehuris Montero (born 1998), Dominican baseball player
 Enrique Montero (born 1954), Spanish footballer
 Fredy Montero (born 1987), Colombian soccer player
 Gabriela Montero (born 1970), Venezuelan-American classical piano virtuoso
 Jefferson Montero (born 1989), Ecuadorian footballer
 Jesús Montero (born 1989), Venezuelan baseball player
 Juan Esteban Montero (1879–1948), Chilean president (1931–1932)
 Juan Manuel Montero Vázquez (born 1947), Spanish military physician and Surgeon General
 Leonardo Montero, Argentine TV host
 Mayra Montero (born 1952), Cuban-Puerto Rican writer
 Miguel Montero (born 1983), Venezuelan-American baseball player
 Miguel Montero (tango singer) (1922–1975), Argentine tango singer
 Pablo Montero (born 1974), Mexican singer and actor
 Paolo Montero (born 1971), Uruguayan footballer
 Pilar Montero (1921–2012), American bar and restaurant owner
 Rafael Montero (disambiguation), several people
 Ricardo Montero (referee) (born 1979), Costa Rican football referee
 Ricardo Montero (cyclist) (1902–1974), Spanish racing cyclist
 Rosa Montero (born 1951), Spanish writer

Montero can also be used as a given name. Notable people with the given name include:
 Montero Lamar Hill (born 1999), American rapper and singer-songwriter, known as Lil Nas X

See also
 Monteiro (surname), the Portuguese version of this surname

Spanish-language surnames